The Belnord is an apartment building at Broadway and 86th Street on the Upper West Side of Manhattan in New York City. It is a New York City Landmark and it was added to the National Register of Historic Places in 1980.

Construction 
The Belnord was designed in 1908 by the architectural firm of Hiss and Weekes and finished construction in 1909. The architect boasted to The New York Times that it was "largest apartment house in this country, if not in the world."

It had 175 apartments for rent, housing more than 1,500 people.

It is 13 stories tall and features Italian Renaissance style decorative elements. One of a handful of full-block apartment buildings in New York, it features two massive, two-story grand archways that provide entrance to an inner courtyard (one of the largest in the city) with landscaped gardens. Notable residents have included the writer Isaac Bashevis Singer, actor Zero Mostel and jazz impresario Art D'Lugoff.

History 
The building was acquired by Extell Development Company in 1994 for $15 million. For the next 20 years, Extell fought to deregulate the building and remove its rent-stabilized status. In March 2015, the residential portion of the building was sold to the HFZ Capital Group for $575 million. HFZ hired architect Robert A. M. Stern to renovate 95 of the building's apartments, which would be sold as condos for a total value of over $1.35 billion.

The Belnord was used for exterior shots as the fictional Arconia Building in the comedic murder mystery series Only Murders in the Building.

See also
National Register of Historic Places listings in Manhattan from 59th to 110th Streets
List of New York City Designated Landmarks in Manhattan from 59th to 110th Streets
The Apthorp – another full-block apartment building with an interior courtyard

References
Notes

Further reading

External links

Residential buildings on the National Register of Historic Places in Manhattan
Residential buildings completed in 1908
Renaissance Revival architecture in New York City
Full-block apartment buildings in New York City
Apartment buildings in New York City
New York City Designated Landmarks in Manhattan
Upper West Side
1908 establishments in New York City